The Tartan 34 C is an American sailboat, that was designed by Sparkman & Stephens and first built in 1968. The boat is Sparkman & Stephens Design Number 1904.

The Tartan 34 C was initially marketed as the Tartan 34. When a later, unrelated design was introduced in 1984, it was also marketed as the Tartan 34. To differentiate the two designs the older one is commonly called the Tartan 34 C, with the "C" indicating Classic. The latter Tartan 34 became commonly known as the Tartan 34-2.

Production
The Tartan 34 C was built by Tartan Marine in the United States between 1968 and 1978, with 525 examples completed, but it is now out of production.

Design
The Tartan 34 C is a small recreational keelboat, built predominantly of fiberglass, with wood trim. It has a masthead sloop rig, a skeg-mounted rudder and a fixed stub keel, with a retractable centerboard. It displaces  and carries  of lead ballast.

The design had a factory option of a pilot berth in place of the port storage cabinet, over and outboard of the dinette, but few boats were so equipped. A yawl rig, with a mizzen mast, was also a factory option.

The mainsail foot dimension (parameter "E") was reduced at least twice during the boat's production run, increasing the aspect ratio of the mainsail to improve sail balance and to lower the design's International Offshore Rule handicap rating.

See also
List of sailing boat types

Similar sailboats
Beneteau 331
Beneteau First Class 10
C&C 34
C&C 34/36
Catalina 34
Coast 34
Columbia 34
Columbia 34 Mark II
Creekmore 34
Crown 34
CS 34
Hunter 34
San Juan 34
Sea Sprite 34
S&S 34
Sun Odyssey 349
UFO 34 (yacht)
Viking 34

References

Keelboats
1960s sailboat type designs
Sailing yachts
Sailboat type designs by Sparkman and Stephens
Sailboat types built by Tartan Marine